Long Marston is a village and civil parish in the Harrogate district of North Yorkshire, England.

The Battle of Marston Moor was fought just west of the village. There is a monument to the battle on the Tockwith Road to the north of the village.

Governance
Long Marston falls in the electoral ward of Marston Moor. This ward stretches north to Tockwith and has a total population taken at the 2011 census of 2,888.

Amenities

The village has the Anglican All Saints' Church, a junior school and a public house, the Sun Inn.  The Sun Inn is owned and operated by Samuel Smiths Old Brewery.  Until 2008 it had a Wesleyan Methodist chapel which closed due to dwindling attendances. In 2011 the demolition of the chapel, and replacement with a detached dwelling was approved.

The village has a Village Hall located off Butt Hedge on Angram Road. The playing fields are home to the two cricket teams which compete in the Wetherby Cricket league.

The Old Post Office and Lodore, on Angram Road, are Grade II listed buildings.

Transport
The B1224 road cuts through the village, running approximately east-to-west. The village crossroads, the location of the Sun Inn, is the main junction of the B1224 with Tockwith Road, which heads north, and Angram Road, which heads south.  There are bus services to Wetherby and York.

The nearest railway stations are at Hammerton and Poppleton.

Hutton Wandesley
The small hamlet of Hutton Wandesley is directly adjacent to the village and forms part of the civil parish of Long Marston.  Hutton Wandesley was historically a township in the ancient parish of Long Marston.  It became a separate civil parish in 1866.  In 1988 the parish was absorbed into the civil parish of Long Marston.

Notable residents
Sir Henry Thompson, Lord Mayor of York (1663 & 1672), Deputy Lieutenant of the West Riding of Yorkshire (1665) and MP for York (1673–1873) died in Long Marston.

References

External links

Official village website

Villages in North Yorkshire
Civil parishes in North Yorkshire